Haug may refer to:

Places
Haug, Minnesota, United States
Haug Range, Greenland
Haugsbygda, Ringerike

Other uses
Haug (surname)